The Women's sprint competition at the FIS Nordic World Ski Championships 2019 was held on 21 February 2019.

Results

Qualification
The qualification was held at 12:00.

Quarterfinals

Quarterfinal 1

Quarterfinal 2

Quarterfinal 3

Quarterfinal 4

Quarterfinal 5

Semifinals

Semifinal 1

Semifinal 2

Final

References

Women's sprint